Al-Yamun is a Palestinian town located nine kilometers west of Jenin in the Jenin Governorate, in the northern West Bank. Al-Yamun's land area consists of approximately 20,000 dunams, of which 1,300 dunams is built-up area.

According to the Palestinian Central Bureau of Statistics, the town had a population of 16,383 inhabitants in the 2007 census. The population is formed mainly of a number of families such as Frehat, Khamaysa, Samudi, Hushiya, Abu al-Hija, Samara, 'Abahra, Zaid, Jaradat, Sharqieh and Nawahda that sourced many inspirational figures such as Jad and Ayham Frihat.

History
The town is an ancient one, where  two columns and two capitals have been reused at the door of the mosque.

Potsherds from the early and late Roman, Byzantine, early Muslim and the Middle Ages have been found here.

Ottoman era
It had a population of 28 households, all Muslim. They paid a  fixed tax rate of 25% on agricultural products, including wheat, barley, summer crops, olive trees, goats and beehives, in addition to  occasional revenues; a total of  15,000 akçe. Potsherds from the Ottoman era have also been found here.

In 1799, al-Yamun was named  the village  Ellamoun on the map Pierre Jacotin made during the French campaign in Egypt and Syria.

In 1838 Edward Robinson noted it on his travels,  and in  1870 Victor Guérin found that Yamun had 500 inhabitants, and was divided into two quarters, each commanded by its own sheikh.

In 1882 the PEF's Survey of Western Palestine described it as “A large village, with olives round it, standing on high ground, with a well on the east. This appears to be the 'Janna of the Onomasticon,’ 3 miles south of Legio; does not exactly agree, being 7 English miles."

British Mandate era
In the 1922 census of Palestine, conducted  by the British Mandate authorities, Yamun had a population of 1,485; all Muslims except one Christian who was Orthodox.  The population increased in the 1931 census to 1,836;  all Muslim, in  a total of 371 houses.

In  the 1945 statistics the population was 2,520; all  Muslims, with 20,361 dunams of land, according to an official land and population survey.  6,036 dunams were used for plantations and irrigable land, 11,121 dunams for cereals, while a total of 58 dunams were built-up, urban land.

Jordanian era
In the wake of the 1948 Arab–Israeli War, and after the 1949 Armistice Agreements, al-Yamun came  under Jordanian rule.  Some of al-Yamun inhabitants descended from Abu-Hija, a commander who came to Palestine with Saladin. After 1948, al-Yamun received fellow Abu-Hija descendants  from the depopulated village of Ein Hod, presently in Israel.

In 1961, the population of al-Yamun was  4,173.

Post-1967
Since the Six-Day War in 1967, al-Yamun has been under Israeli occupation.

On October 29, 2008, Muhammad 'Abahra, a farmer in the town was killed by the IDF. 'Abahra had a shotgun in his possession leading the IDF to believe he would fire at them. 'Abahra's son, however, alleged, that his father was guarding his sheep from suspected thieves.

References

Bibliography

 
 (p. 225)

External links
Welcome to al  Yamun
Yamun, Welcome to Palestine
Survey of Western Palestine, Map 8: IAA, Wikimedia commons 
  Jacotin map #46
 many photos from al yamoun

Jenin Governorate
Cities in the West Bank
Municipalities of the State of Palestine